Marc Philip Ellison (born 11 October 1986) is a New Zealand cricketer. He made his first-class debut for Northern Knights in the 2018 Inter-Provincial Championship on 29 May 2018. Prior to his first-class debut, he was the captain of the New Zealand squad for the 2006 Under-19 Cricket World Cup.

He made his List A debut for Northern Knights in the 2018 Inter-Provincial Cup on 4 June 2018.

References

External links
 

1986 births
Living people
New Zealand cricketers
Place of birth missing (living people)
Northern Knights cricketers